State Road 300 (NM 300) is a  state highway in the US state of New Mexico. NM 300's southern terminus is at Interstate 25 (I-25), U.S. Route 84 (US 84), US 85 and US 285 south of Santa Fe, and the northern terminus is at NM 466 in Santa Fe.

Major intersections

See also

References

300
Transportation in Santa Fe County, New Mexico